To Talk For The Sake Of Talking (Hablar por hablar in Spanish, Parlar per parlar in Catalan) is a nighttime radio talk show broadcast by Cadena SER in Spain and Radio Caracol in Colombia.

The show was created by Gemma Nierga for Radio Barcelona in 1989. In its 2007 spring season, it had an audience average of 604,000 listeners.

The program receives telephone calls from listeners who express their problems or opinions and receive advice and feedback.

Seasons

Cadena Ser and Radio Barcelona (Cadena Ser) in Spain
Parlar per parlar (in Catalan and Spanish for Catalonia and Andorra)

Hablar por hablar(in Spanish for all Spain)

Radio Caracol in Colombia
 Hablar por hablar

See also
 Cadena SER
 Radio Caracol

External links
 Hablar por hablar program page
 Cadena SER web site

Spanish radio programs